Dan van Husen (30 April 1945 – 31 May 2020) was a German actor. He started his career in the 1960s, playing in a number of Spaghetti Westerns (usually he was cast as the bad guy), and also performed in Italian and German films by renowned directors including Frederico Fellini and Werner Herzog and in German TV series. Starting in the 2000s he performed in Hollywood films, and in 2008 had a role in a Dutch World War 2 movie, Winter in Wartime.

Early life
Dan van Husen was born in Gummersbach, Germany, on 30 April 1945, the day Adolf Hitler committed suicide in Berlin.

Career
He was first discovered by Italian producers while working as a club disc jockey in Spain and began working increasingly seriously as an actor in the late 60s. He appeared in twenty Italo Westerns in six or seven years and before branching out to diverse roles and genres. In the years 1968-1974 he participated in more than 24 Italo Westerns, amongst others directed by Sergio Corbucci, Sergio Martino, Enzo G. Castellari etc. In 1977, he was also involved in the play Courage at the Schauspielhaus Bochum, directed by Jérôme Savary. He was cast as the bad guy in 90% of his films.

Van Husen was credited for numerous further film appearances such as Fellini Casanova, by Federico Fellini, in Salon Kitty by Tinto Brass and Nosferatu the Vampyre directed by Werner Herzog,  amongst others.

He also worked in German TV series such as The Old Fox, Derrick, Alarm für Cobra 11 - Die Autobahnpolizei and many more. He was often cast as a rogue as in the television disaster film Tsunami or in the '80s cult film Ritchy Guitar of Michael Laux, and in the film Cold and Dark directed by Andrew Goth.

In 2001, he worked on Band of Brothers, a Steven Spielberg production, Perfect Strangers directed by Stephen Poliakoff and in Enemy at the Gates directed by Jean-Jacques Annaud, as well as Hart's War directed by Gregory Hoblit in 2002.

In 2006, he acted in the German television film Karol Woityla directed by Gero von Boehm and in 2007 in Gellert, a motion picture film under the direction of Ayassi with Ken Duken and the German TV crime series SOKO Wismar.

In February/March 2008, he worked on Winter in Wartime a Dutch movie based on the hit novel by the same name, written by Jan Terlouw and directed (and written) by Martin Koolhoven. In June and July 2010, he worked in southern California on the American Western film Scarlet Worm, in the role of the antagonist Heinrich Kley, directed by Michael Fredianelli.

In 2011, he worked on the American film production Tom Sawyer and Huckleberry Finn, directed by Jo Kastner, and got invited to the Spaghetti Western Film Festival in Los Angeles on 19 March of that year.  He attended the Almería Western Film Festival from 8 to 11 September 2011, and received a lifetime achievement award in the western film genre.  He then got invited to the Lund International Fantastic Film Festival in Sweden, from 15 to 24 September 2011. He attended the Cinefest 2011, VIII, and Internationales Festival des deutschen Film-Erbes Hamburg from 12 to 20 November 2011.

Death
Dan van Husen died from COVID-19 in Ilminster, Somerset, England in May 2020, during the COVID-19 pandemic in England at age 75.

Selected filmography
Van Husen played in film including:

 The Cats (1968) (uncredited)
 Las trompetas del apocalipsis (1969), as Beatnik (uncredited)
 Sundance and the Kid (1969), as Cowboy on the Train (uncredited)
 A Bullet for Sandoval (1969), as Mestizo
 Robin Hood: the Invincible Archer (1970)
 El Condor (1970), as Bandit
 Arizona Colt Returns (1970)
 The Arizona Kid (1970)
 More Dollars for the MacGregors (1970), as Frank Landon (uncredited)
 Cannon for Cordoba (1970), as Soldier (uncredited)
 Light the Fuse... Sartana Is Coming (1970), as Deputy Sheriff in Sandy Creek (uncredited)
 The Trojan Women (1971), as Soldier (uncredited)
 Doc (1971), as Clanton Cowboy (uncredited)
 Captain Apache (1971), as Al
 Catlow (1971), as Dutch
 Boulevard du Rhum (1971), as Un tireur (uncredited)
 Bad Man's River (1971)
 Kill! Kill! Kill! Kill! (1971), as Bodyguard (uncredited)
 Long Live Your Death (1971), as Kelly, Prison Guard
 Condenados a vivir (1972), as Lackey (uncredited)
 Sonny and Jed (1972), as Bounty Hunter (uncredited)
 Cry of the Black Wolves (1972), as Joe
 Pancho Villa (1972), as Bart
 Der Todesrächer von Soho (1972), as Kronstel
 100 Fäuste und ein Vaterunser (1972)
 Verflucht, dies Amerika (1973) (uncredited)
 Zinksärge für die Goldjungen (1973), as O'Brian
 Tendre et perverse Emanuelle (1973), as Inspecteur Siodmak
 La noche de los asesinos (1974), as Albert Pagan (uncredited)
 The White, the Yellow, and the Black (1975), as Albino, Donovan's Cousin (uncredited)
 John Glückstadt (1975), as Wenzel
 Cipolla Colt (1975), as Deputy Zachary
  (1975)
 Salon Kitty (1976), as Rauss
  (1976) (uncredited)
  (1976), as Smoothie Nestler
  (1976), as Killer
 Fellini's Casanova (1976), as Viderol / Faulkircher's lover (uncredited)
 Paradies (1976)
 Eierdiebe (1977)
  (1977, TV Movie), as Zaplata
 Kiss Me Killer (1977), as Jules (uncredited)
 The Rip-Off (1978), as Hans
 Nosferatu the Vampyre (1979), as Warden
  (1979), as Security Guard
 The Lady Vanishes (1979), as 2nd Killer
 Bloodline (1979), as Cameraman
 Avalanche Express (1979), as Bernardo
  (1979), as Harry
 Graf Dracula in Oberbayern (1979), as Franz
 Derrick (1979-1980, TV Series), as Walter Lohmann / Moersch
  (1980)
 The Sea Wolves (1980), as U-boat First Officer
  (1981)
 Freak Orlando (1981), as Lederboy
  (1982)
 Comeback (1982), as Pimp
 Ich bin dein Killer (1982), as Danny
  (1985), as Tough Guy
 Gotcha! (1985), as Man in Shadow
 Wild Geese II (1985), as Stroebling's Driver
 The Holcroft Covenant (1985), as Journalist (uncredited)
  (1985), as Brute
 Morena (1986), as Henry, Street Painter
 Enemy at the Gates (2001), as Political Officer
 Hart's War (2002), as Boxcar Sergeant
 Killer Barbys vs. Dracula (2002), as Seaward
 Darkhunters (2004), as Jack
 Cold and Dark (2005), as Solly Tunkel
 Forest of the Damned (2005), as Crazy Old Man
 Drawn in Blood (2006), as Bergen
 The Man Who Sold the World (2006), as Zisna
 Winter in Wartime (2008), as Auer
 The Scarlet Worm (2011), as Heinrich Kley
 One Last Game (2011), as Obonya
 Killing all the Flies (2013, TV Movie), as Simon Moskovitz
 Tom Sawyer & Huckleberry Finn (2014), as Windy
 Zombie Massacre 2: Reich of the Dead (2015), as Doktor Mengele
 Brimstone (2016), as Coach Driver
 EXCRETION: The Shocking True Story of the Football Moms (2017), as Dr. Helmut Rechte
 In Search of Fellini (2017), as Dan van Husen
 Le Accelerator (2017), as The Death Advisor
 The Price of Death (2018), as Wolfgang
 Beyond Fury (2019), as Reverend Tony Mortimer

References

External links 
  
 
 
 Dan van Husen fernsehserien.de

1945 births
2020 deaths
People from Gummersbach
German male film actors
German male television actors
German expatriates in England
20th-century German male actors
21st-century German male actors
Male Spaghetti Western actors
Deaths from the COVID-19 pandemic in England
German expatriates in Italy